Imran Mayo, also known as Muhammad Imran Junior, is a field hockey player on the Pakistan National Hockey Team.

References

Pakistani male field hockey players
Living people
Year of birth missing (living people)